Riva may refer to:

People
 Riva (surname)
 Riva Castleman (1930–2014), American art historian, art curator and author
 Riva Ganguly Das (born 1961), Indian diplomat
 Riva (footballer), Brazilian former footballer Rivadávio Alves Pereira (born 1944)
 Riva Taylor, professional name of English singer/songwriter Rebecca Jane Grosvenor-Taylor
 A diminutive of Rebecca (given name)

Places
 Riva, Beykoz, a village in Istanbul Province, Turkey
 Riva, Maryland, a census-designated place in the United States
 Riva del Garda, a town and comune in northern Italy

In music
 Riva Records, a record label
 Riva (band), a former Yugoslavian band
 An alternative name used by Dutch producing duo Zki & Dobre
 "Riva (Restart the Game)", a 2015 song by Klingande featuring Broken Back

In business
 Riva, an Italian yachtbuilding company, part of the Ferretti Group as of 2000
 Gruppo Riva, an Italian steel company
 Lada Riva, an automobile
 Riva Fashion, a fashion brand in the Middle East

Other uses
 RIVA, a line of graphics cards made by Nvidia Corporation
 Riva Ridge, winner of the 1972 Kentucky Derby and Belmont Stakes, stablemate to Triple Crown winner Secretariat 
 Riva (Star Trek), a deaf and mute fictional character in Star Trek